Athing Mu (born June 8, 2002) is an American middle-distance runner. She is the youngest woman in history to own Olympic and world titles in an individual track and field event. At the age of 19, Mu won the gold medal in the 800 meters at the 2020 Tokyo Olympics, breaking a national record set by Ajeé Wilson in 2017, and a continental under-20 record. She took a second gold as part of the women's 4 × 400 m relay. She is the 800 m 2022 World champion, becoming the first American woman to win the world championship title over the distance.

Mu holds the world under-20 record in the women's indoor 800 m, which she set in early 2021. She also holds the world U20 best in the indoor 600 meters, set in 2019 when she was 16 years of age. Her time is the third fastest ever run indoors.

Early life
Athing Mu was born and raised in Trenton, New Jersey, and is the second youngest of seven siblings. Her parents immigrated to the United States from South Sudan, and her family is of South Sudanese heritage. She began competing in track at the age of 6. Mu did not join her high school track team, choosing to compete instead for Trenton Track Club. She graduated from Trenton Central High School in 2020.

Career
On February 24, 2019, Mu broke the American women's record at the 600 meter event at the 2019 USA Indoor Track and Field Championships with a time of 1:23.57. She bested the previous American women's record of 1:23.59 held by Alysia Montaño, and nearly broke the women's world record of 1:23.44, held by Olga Kotlyarova.

2021
On February 6, Mu ran indoor 50.52 s in the women's 400 meters, which was 0.3 seconds faster than Sanya Richards' official world under-20 record ratified by World Athletics. However, Mu's time was slower than the 50.36 s set by fellow American Sydney McLaughlin, which was not able to meet the standards for world record ratification. On February 27, she ran 1:58.40 in the 800 meters to set an indoor collegiate and world under-20 record. She bested the previous collegiate record by more than two seconds. On April 17 in Waco, Texas, running outdoors, Mu set the 800 meter USA collegiate record with a time of 1:57.73. At the 2021 NCAA Championships in Eugene, Oregon on June 12, 2021, she lowered her collegiate all-time record mark to 49.57 s in winning the 400m, before anchoring the Texas A&M Women's  relay squad to victory and a new collegiate record of 3:22.34 later in the day.

Mu qualified for the delayed 2020 Tokyo Olympics at the US Olympic trials held in Eugene, Oregon by placing first in the event with a time of 1:56.07, a world-leading time and the second-fastest result in American history. At the Tokyo Games, she won two gold medals for the women's 800 meters and women's 4 x 400 meters relay. In her individual event, Mu led from gun to tape in a dominant showing, finishing clear ahead of Keely Hodgkinson and compatriot Raevyn Rogers. She broke the American women's 800 meter record with a 1m 55.21s performance and ended a 53-year Olympic win drought for the USA – the last American woman who won the event was Madeline Manning at the 1968 Mexico Olympics (first Olympic 800m male or female win since Dave Wottle at the Munich 1972). Mu became also the youngest U.S. woman to win individual Olympic track and field title since Wyomia Tyus earned the 100 m title at the 1964 Tokyo Games.

In her first post-Olympic race at the Prefontaine Classic, she set even better American 800 m record of one minute 55.04 seconds despite running by herself over the final lap, also the all-comers' record, making her the second fastest U20 woman ever after Pamela Jelimo and putting her eighth on the world all-time list.

In that record-breaking season Mu competed 36 times (including rounds) and triumphed in 35 races to be voted World Athletics Female Rising Star of the Year.

2022
At the World Championships in Eugene, Oregon in July, Mu this time barely held off Hodgkinson to take the women's 800 m gold with a world-leading time of 1:56.30. She won by 0.08 s after a tight finish on the home stretch, with Mary Moraa trailing in third. Thus, Mu became the first American woman to win the 800 m world championship title, and the youngest woman in history to own Olympic and world titles in an individual track and field event. She also extended her outdoor win streak to nearly three years as she hadn’t lost an outdoor race (in any round, at any distance) since September 2019.

Achievements
All information taken from World Athletics profile.

Personal bests

International competitions

Circuit wins
 Diamond League
 2021 (800 m): Eugene Prefontaine Classic (1:55.04   )
 2022 (800 m): Rome Golden Gala (1:57.01 )

National championships

References

External links

 
 
 
 
 
 
  (Track & Field Results Reporting System)

2002 births
Living people
American people of South Sudanese descent
American sportspeople of African descent
Sportspeople of South Sudanese descent
African-American female track and field athletes
Athletes (track and field) at the 2018 Summer Youth Olympics
Sportspeople from Trenton, New Jersey
Pan American Games track and field athletes for the United States
Athletes (track and field) at the 2019 Pan American Games
USA Indoor Track and Field Championships winners
Texas A&M Aggies women's track and field athletes
Track and field athletes from New Jersey
Trenton Central High School alumni
United States collegiate record holders in athletics (track and field)
USA Outdoor Track and Field Championships winners
Athletes (track and field) at the 2020 Summer Olympics
Medalists at the 2020 Summer Olympics
Olympic gold medalists for the United States in track and field
World Athletics Championships medalists
World Athletics Championships winners
21st-century African-American sportspeople
21st-century African-American women